Ozaukee County is a county in the U.S. state of Wisconsin. As of the 2020 census, the population was 91,503. Its county seat is Port Washington, making it one of three Wisconsin counties on Lake Michigan not to have a county seat with the same name. Ozaukee County is included in the Milwaukee–Waukesha–West Allis, WI Metropolitan Statistical Area.

As of the 2000 Census, Ozaukee County had the second-lowest poverty rate of any county in the United States, at 2.6%. In terms of per capita income, it is the 25th-wealthiest county in the country. Bolstered by low crime rates and school districts with high graduation rates, Forbes magazine ranked Ozaukee County #2 on its list of "America's Best Places To Raise A Family" in June 2008.

Toponymy
"Ozaukee" comes from the Ojibwe name for the Sauk people. It probably means "people living at the mouth of a river."

History

Precolonial
The Hilgen Spring Mound Site is one of the oldest-known sites of human habitation of Ozaukee County. Located near Cedar Creek in the eastern part of the City of Cedarburg, the site consists of three conical burial mounds constructed by early Woodland period Mound Builders. In 1968, archaeologists from the Milwaukee Public Museum found human burials and artifacts, including stone altars, arrowheads, and pottery shards, during an excavation of one of the mounds. Radiocarbon samples from the excavation date the mounds' construction to approximately 480 BCE, making it one of the oldest mound groups in the state.

In the mid-1800s, Increase A. Lapham identified a group of circular mounds in the Saukville area and found a stone ax. In his writing, Lapham did not speculate about the age of the artifact or the mounds. An additional artifact of the early Native American presence in the Saukville area is the Ozaukee County Birdstone, discovered by a six-year-old farm boy in 1891. While the exact age of the Ozaukee County Birdstone remains uncertain, many birdstones date from a period ranging from 3000 BCE to 500 BCE.

19th century
In the early 19th century, the Native Americans living in Ozaukee County included the Menominee, Potawatomi, and Sauk people. There were numerous Native American villages in the county along the Milwaukee River and its tributaries. The Menominee surrendered their claims to the land east of the Milwaukee River to the United States Federal Government in 1832 through the Treaty of Washington. The Potawatomi surrendered their claims to the land west of the river in 1833 through the 1833 Treaty of Chicago, which (after being ratified in 1835) required them to leave the area by 1838. While many Potawatomi people moved west of the Mississippi River to Kansas, some chose to remain in Wisconsin, and were known as "strolling Potawatomi" because they were migrant squatters. Eventually the Potawatomi who evaded forced removal gathered in northern Wisconsin, where they formed the Forest County Potawatomi Community.

The first whites in the area were primarily New England land speculators, who began purchasing land from the government in 1835 at the price of $1.25 per acre. One of these land speculators was Wooster Harrison, who settled the land that would become Port Washington in 1835, which he originally named "Wisconsin City." At the time, the land was part of Washington County, and there were proposals that Port Washington become the county seat. However, Port Washington was far from the county's other early settlements, including Mequon, Grafton and Germantown. In 1850, the Wisconsin legislature bisected Washington County into northern and southern counties, with Port Washington as the northern seat and Cedarburg as the southern. County residents failed to ratify the bill, and in 1853 the legislature instead bisected the county into eastern and western sections, creating Ozaukee County. Port Washington became the seat of the new county, and the Washington County seat moved to West Bend.

In the 1840s, German, Irish, and Luxembourger immigrants began settling in the county. Germans were the largest ethnic group in and 19th century Ozaukee County, with seven in eight residents being of German descent according to the 1870 census. The earliest settlements formed around grist- and sawmills located on the county's waterways. Cedarburg, Grafton, Hamilton, Newburg, Saukville, and Thiensville all had mills by end of the 1840s. In the 19th and early 20th centuries, the county economy was primarily based on agriculture.

The beginning of the American Civil War saw some chaos in Ozaukee County. The county was one of the areas affected by Wisconsin's "Great Indian Scare" of September 1862, in which some residents panicked because of unfounded rumors of a Native American uprising in the state. The panic was exacerbated by the fact that 30,000 Wisconsinites were away, serving in the war, so residents may have felt especially vulnerable. Some residents fled their homes for Milwaukee, while others holed up in makeshift fortresses, as happened at the Cedarburg Mill. Several months after the panic, the United States Congress implemented the draft, which was unpopular among German immigrants with bad memories of mandatory conscription in their homelands. On November 10, 1862, several hundred Port Washington residents marched on the courthouse, attacked the official in charge of implementing the draft, burned draft records, and vandalized the homes of Union supporters. The riot ended when eight detachments of Union troops from Milwaukee were deployed.

In the 1870s the Milwaukee & Northern Railway was constructed to connect Milwaukee and northern Wisconsin including Green Bay, along its route it reached many communities in the center of the county including Thiensville, Cedarburg, Grafton and Saukville. Around the same time the Milwaukee, Lake Shore and Western Railway constructed its railway on the eastern edge of the county along Lake Michigan, also to connect Milwaukee and Northern Wisconsin. It reached fewer communities compared to the M&N line, only serving Port Washington. Regardless the railroads spurned development in Ozaukee County by providing efficient freight and passenger transportation.

20th century
From 1908 to 1940, the Milwaukee Electric Railway and Light Company (TMERL) provided electric interurban passenger and freight service from Sheboygan to Milwaukee with stops at Belgium, Port Washington, Grafton, Cedarburg, Thiensville, Mequon, and other villages as well as major road crossings within Ozaukee County. The interurban cars ran approximately once per hour and delivered Ozaukee County agricultural products, such as milk and meat, to Milwaukee grocers and butchers. In 1940, the interurban ceased servicing Sheboygan due to declining ridership. Port Washington became the line's new northern terminus before the Ozaukee County line ceased operation in 1948.<ref name="ReferenceB"

Ozaukee County's communities experienced significant population growth during the suburbanization that followed World War II. Between 1940 and 1980, the population more than tripled, from 18,985 to 66,981. Although the interurban to Milwaukee declined service and finally ceased operation after the war, the construction of Interstate 43 in the mid-1960s allowed more residents to commute long distances to jobs and this encouraged residential home construction. Communities that experienced the most significant population growth, such as Cedarburg and Grafton, began to annex agricultural land for residential subdivisions and retail commercial development. The previously rural Town of Mequon became increasingly suburban and incorporated in 1957 as the City of Mequon. Today, it is the largest and most populous city in Ozaukee County.

Geography

Ozaukee County covers 233 square miles of land, making it the second smallest county in Wisconsin by land area after Pepin County. The county's jurisdiction also extends over 883 square miles of water, most of which is in Lake Michigan.

Lion's Den Gorge Nature Preserve is a large bluffland and wetland county protected area on the shore of Lake Michigan.

Major highways
  Interstate 43
  Highway 32 (Wisconsin)
  Highway 33 (Wisconsin)
  Highway 57 (Wisconsin)
  Highway 60 (Wisconsin)
  Highway 167 (Wisconsin)
  Highway 181 (Wisconsin)

Railroads
Union Pacific
Wisconsin and Southern Railroad

Buses
Milwaukee County Transit System
List of intercity bus stops in Wisconsin

Adjacent counties
 Sheboygan County - north
 Oceana County, Michigan - northeast
 Muskegon County, Michigan - east
 Milwaukee County - south
 Waukesha County - southwest
 Washington County - west

Demographics

2020 census
As of the census of 2020, the population was 91,503. The racial makeup of the county was 89.9% White, 2.5% Asian, 1.7% Black or African American, 0.3% Native American, 1.1% from other races, and 4.6% from two or more races. Ethnically, the population was 3.4% Hispanic or Latino of any race.

2000 census
As of the census of 2000, there were 82,317 people, 30,857 households, and 23,019 families residing in the county. The population density was 355 people per square mile (137/km2). There were 32,034 housing units at an average density of 138 per square mile (53/km2). The racial makeup of the county was 96.72% White, 0.93% Black or African American, 0.20% Native American, 1.07% Asian, 0.02% Pacific Islander, 0.34% from other races, and 0.73% from two or more races. 1.30% of the population were Hispanic or Latino of any race. 47.2% were of German, 7.3% Irish and 6.7% Polish ancestry. 95.1% spoke English, 1.6% Spanish and 1.4% German as their first language.

There were 30,857 households, out of which 36.00% had children under the age of 18 living with them, 65.60% were married couples living together, 6.50% had a female householder with no husband present, and 25.40% were non-families. 21.40% of all households were made up of individuals, and 8.40% had someone living alone who was 65 years of age or older. The average household size was 2.61 and the average family size was 3.07.

In the county, the population was spread out, with 26.60% under the age of 18, 6.80% from 18 to 24, 28.00% from 25 to 44, 25.90% from 45 to 64, and 12.60% who were 65 years of age or older. The median age was 39 years. For every 100 females there were 97.30 males. For every 100 females age 18 and over, there were 94 males.

The median income for a household in the county was $62,745, and the median income for a family was $72,547 (these figures had risen to $73,197 and $88,231 respectively as of a 2007 estimate). Males had a median income of $50,044 versus $30,476 for females. The per capita income for the county was $31,947. About 1.7% of families and 2.6% of the population were below the poverty line, including 2.6% of those under age 18 and 4.1% of those age 65 or over.

Religious statistics
The Association of Religion Data Archives reported that as of 2010, the largest religious group in Ozaukee County is the Roman Catholic Archdiocese of Milwaukee, with 28,644 adherents spread across eight parishes. Although the number of Catholics in the county is around the same as it was in 1990, the number of parishes has declined from twelve in 1990 to eight in 2010, because of the mergers of small, rural and local parishes into larger, multi-campus parishes, such as the St. John XXIII Congregation in Port Washington and Saukville, which formed from the merger of three parishes and holds services in three church buildings. Other large religious groups in the county include 8,464 Missouri Synod Lutherans with seven congregations, 5,094 ELCA Lutherans with ten congregations, 2,702 Wisconsin Synod Lutherans with seven congregations, 1,795 adherents of the Presbyterian Church (USA) with one congregation, 1,558 adherents of the United Church of Christ with three congregations, 1,154 UMC Methodists with three congregations, 1,061 adherents of the evangelical Christian and Missionary Alliance with two congregations, 794 non-denominational Christians with four congregations, and 695 adherents of Orthodox and Reconstructionist Judaism with three synagogues, as well as other congregations in the Baháʼí, Christian Scientist, evangelical Protestant, Greek Orthodox, Hindu, Jehovah's Witnesses, Latter-day Saints, mainline Protestant, and Unitarian Universalist traditions.

Transportation

Ozaukee County has a harbor in Port Washington on Lake Michigan, though not in the lakeside communities of Mequon or Grafton due to high bluffs along the lakeshore.

The Ozaukee County Interurban Trail is a multimodal trail for pedestrians and non-motorized vehicles. It runs through Grafton and connects to Sheboygan County and Brown Deer Trails via the old Milwaukee-Sheboygan Passenger Rail line.

Public transit is provided by a commuter express bus (Route 143) to Milwaukee with stops in Port Washington, Saukville, Grafton, and Mequon. The bus operates Monday through Fridays excluding holidays, and is run jointly by Milwaukee and Ozaukee County. The county offers a daily shared taxi, with connections to Washington County Transit and Milwaukee County Routes 12, 49 and 42u.

Politics
As one of the suburban counties surrounding Milwaukee, Ozaukee County is a Republican stronghold in U.S. presidential elections, having voted Republican in all elections (except one) since 1940. Lyndon B. Johnson was the last Democrat to carry the county in a presidential election, in 1964. In 2020, Joe Biden became the first Democrat to win over 40% of the vote since 1964.

Communities

Cities
 Cedarburg
 Mequon
 Port Washington (county seat)

Villages

 Bayside (mostly in Milwaukee County)
 Belgium
 Fredonia
 Grafton
 Newburg (mostly in Washington County)
 Saukville
 Thiensville

Towns

 Belgium
 Cedarburg
 Fredonia
 Grafton
 Port Washington
 Saukville

Census-designated place
 Waubeka

Unincorporated communities

 Dacada (partial)
 Decker
 Decker Corner
 Druecker
 Hamilton
 Holy Cross
 Horns Corners
 Knellsville
 Lake Church
 Lakefield
 Little Kohler
 Sauk Trail Beach
 Ulao

Ghost town
 Stonehaven

High schools 

 Cedarburg High School
 Grafton High School
 Homestead High School (Mequon-Thiensville)
 Ozaukee High School (Fredonia)
 Port Washington High School

See also
 National Register of Historic Places listings in Ozaukee County, Wisconsin

References

Further reading
 History of Washington and Ozaukee Counties, Wisconsin. Chicago: Western Historical Company, 1881.

External links
 Ozaukee County website
 Ozaukee County map from the Wisconsin Department of Transportation
 Ozaukee County Transit
 Ozaukee County Interurban Trail

 
1853 establishments in Wisconsin
Populated places established in 1853